The United Nations University Press was the publishing division of the United Nations University in Tokyo. It focused on academic research and scholarly publications revolving around the mission of the United Nations. It published mostly in English. It closed in January 2014, and its publishing activities then ended. The university has since made its publications freely available online at UNU Collections. It was voluntarily funded by governments, development assistance agencies, foundations and other public- and private-sector sources.

See also

 List of English-language book publishing companies
 List of university presses

References

External links
Collections at UNU

United Nations University